Gardinia amynitica is a moth of the family Erebidae. It was described by Hering in 1925. It is found in Peru.

References

Lithosiina
Moths described in 1925